Tijn Smolenaars (born 23 February 2005) is a Dutch professional footballer who plays for Jong PSV in the Eerste Divisie as a goalkeeper.

Early life
Smolenaars started playing with PSV academy from 2014 onwards. He also trained with his brother Luuk who is also a goalkeeper.

Career
He signed his first professional contract with PSV in June 2022 keeping him with the club until 2025. He made his professional debut in the Eerste Divisie on 6 January 2023 as Jong PSV played at away against NAC Breda at the Rat Verlegh Stadion. The club had a goalkeeper crisis with more regular starters Niek Schiks and Kjell Peersman injured, and new signing Roy Steur unregistered,
Smolenaars was chosen ahead of Curacao international Tyrick Bodak to start.

International career
Smolenaars made his debut with the Dutch under-18 national team in September 2022 against the Faroe Islands under-18 team.

References

External links
 

Living people
2005 births
Dutch footballers
Eerste Divisie players
Jong PSV players
Association football goalkeepers